Pro Pool is a video game developed by Blade Interactive and published by Codemasters in 2000.

The game had been scheduled to be released in May 2000, but it was delayed for unknown reasons.

Reception

The game received favorable reviews according to the review aggregation website GameRankings.

References

External links
 

2000 video games
Codemasters games
Cue sports video games
Game Boy Color games
Game Boy Color-only games
Video games developed in the United Kingdom